VM Motori S.p.A. is an Italian diesel engine manufacturing company which is wholly owned by Stellantis. VM headquarters and main production facilities are located in Cento, in Emilia-Romagna, Italy.

History 
VM Motori was founded by two entrepreneurs, Claudio Vancini and Ugo Martelli (hence the "VM") in 1947.

VM merged with Stabilimenti Meccanici Triestini in Trieste in 1971, then Finmeccanica took a majority stake in the combined company. The company was referred to as "Finmeccanica VM" for many years.

In 1989, Finmeccanica restructured, selling its stake in VM Motori to company managers and Midland Montague in a leveraged buyout, leaving the company with its single Cento plant.

Detroit Diesel Corporation (DDC) bought VM Motori in 1995. In 2000, DDC was purchased by DaimlerChrysler AG.

In 2003, Penske Corporation purchased a 51% stake in VM Motori; in 2007, Penske bought the remaining 49% from Detroit Diesel Corporation and subsequently sold 50% of it to General Motors.

In September 2008, GAZ Group announced plans to purchase a 50% stake from Penske Corp, but ultimately cancelled them in February 2009.

On 11 February 2011, Fiat Powertrain Technologies and Penske Corporation had reached an agreement under which Fiat Powertrain would purchase Penske Corporation's fifty-percent stake in VM Motori S.p.A.

Fiat Group Automobiles acquired the remaining 50% stake of VM Motori S.p.A. owned by General Motors, on 28 October 2013.

Products and licensing 

In 1947, the company produced the first Italian air-cooled diesel engine with direct injection.

In 1964, the company introduced entire new families of air-cooled diesel engines for fishing boats and the industrial machine markets.

The year 1974 saw the introduction of a new series of high-speed (4,200 rpm) HR-series, pre-combustion chamber, water-cooled, turbocharged engines.

The Alfa Romeo Alfetta, produced in Arese, rolled off the line with a VM Motori engine under the bonnet in 1979, signaling VM's move to the OEM automotive market. This was Italy's first turbodiesel engine. The engines still retained some maritime features, such as individual heads for each cylinder - a design which made it easier to produce different cylinder configurations.

During the 1980s, British Leyland chose VM engines as the smoothest, most petrol-like units available for diesel models of their Range Rover and Rover SD1; the choice continued with the later Rover 800.

The Covini B24, T40 and C36 models all used VM Motori turbodiesel engines ranging from 4 to 6 cylinders.

The after-cooled, electronic-combustion, "Turbotronic" engine was unveiled in 1990. It was supplied to Alfa Romeo, Chrysler, Ford, General Motors, and Rover.

In 1995, when OEM automotive sales accounted for 75% of income, a major deal with Chrysler saw agreements to supply engines for their Jeep Grand Cherokee and Voyager (2.5-litre) models. VM Motori's 2.8-litre common rail turbodiesel engine was chosen for the Jeep Liberty CRD(Cherokee in Europe). The 2005 and later Chrysler Grand Voyager and 2012 model year Chevrolet Colorado That sale in Thailand is also fitted with the VM 2.8-litre (R428) engine.

In 1998  a new four-cylinder 2.0-litre turbocharged diesel engine and its three-cylinder derivate a 1.5-litre turbocharged diesel engine was developed by VM Motori. Engines featured a single overhead camshaft, four valves per cylinder, and common rail direct fuel injection. Both engines were licensed to the South Korean manufacturer Hyundai. 1.5-litre engine was used in the second generation of the Hyundai Accent, the Hyundai Getz and the Hyundai Matrix. These were produced and marketed between the fall of 2001 and the end of 2005. The 2.0-litre engine was used in many Hyundai and Kia models as the only diesel variant.

In 2004, GM Daewoo licensed the 1.5-litre and 2.0-litre common rail engine designs, and built a dedicated engine plant, which started production 2006. The 2.0 L diesel is used in the Daewoo Winstorm (also badged as the Chevrolet Captiva, and in the related Opel Antara), the Daewoo Lacetti (also badged as the Chevrolet Lacetti), the Daewoo Tosca (also badged as the Chevrolet Epica) and the Chevrolet Cruze.

The latest vehicle to benefit from a 2.5 L VM Motori diesel engine is the purpose-built LTI (London Taxis International) London style taxicab. The TX4 is the first of the TX range of taxis to include a VM Motori engine.

The company is also selling its products to off-highway applications, such as marine and defense. MTU Friedrichshafen, a German diesel engine manufacturer, holds the exclusive sales rights for VM Motori off-highway engines outside of Italy  In the years 2007–2010 the Diesel 2.8 was used in the Dodge Nitro: power: 177 PS (130 kW; 175 hp); torque: 410–460 N⋅m (302–339 lb⋅ft)

In June 2010, VM Motori started the production of the new 2.8L 4-cylinder Euro 5 engine to power the 2011 Jeep Wrangler, 2011 Jeep Cherokee and 2012 Lancia Voyager. On the manual version of the Jeep Wrangler, the A428 features the Stop/Start system to reduce the  emissions.

Thanks to a collaboration with Fiat Powertrain Technologies, the engine features the latest FPT Common Rail Multijet2 technology for improved performance, fuel economy and NVH. In 2013, the engine was redesigned to comply with Euro5+ emissions standards.

The first application of the A 630 DOHC was the 2011 Grand Cherokee. Since 2014, the same engine—rebranded as the EcoDiesel—powers the Ram 1500 and Jeep Grand Cherokee, and in lightly tuned form, the Maserati Ghibli III. The engine won several awards including Ward's 10 Best engines of 2014 during its first model year of production in the Jeep &Ram. And has gone on for an unprecedented diesel 'repeat' winning Ward's Top 10 List again in 2015 and 2016.

See also 

 List of Italian companies
 List of VM Motori engines

Notes

References

External links 
VM Motori
Spare Parts VM Motori

Auto parts suppliers of Italy
Engine manufacturers of Italy
Diesel engine manufacturers
Automotive companies established in 1947
Italian companies established in 1947
General Motors joint ventures
Penske Corporation
Stellantis
Italian brands
Marine engine manufacturers